The United Arab Emirates participated in the 2012 Summer Olympics in London, United Kingdom, which were held from 27 July to 12 August 2012. The country's participation at the London Olympics marked its eighth appearance in the Summer Olympic Games since its début at the 1984 Summer Olympics. The delegation sent by the United Arab Emirates National Olympic Committee consisted of 26 athletes in six different sports: athletics, association football, judo, shooting, swimming and weightlifting. Two of the 26 athletes were women, which included the first Emirati Olympic weightlifter, Khadija Mohammed. The nation also made its Olympic debut in association football with its national under-23 team. None of the athletes won any medals at the Games, with the best result being a ninth-place finish for Khadija Mohammad in the women's heavyweight (–75 kg) weightlifting event.

Background
The United Arab Emirates National Olympic Committee was recognised by the International Olympic Committee (IOC) on 1 January 1980. The nation debuted at the Olympics four years later at the 1984 Summer Games. The nation has taken part in every Summer Olympics since, making the 2012 Games their eighth appearance at a Summer Olympiad. They have never participated in a Winter Olympic Games. The 2012 Summer Olympics were held from 27 July to 12 August 2012; a total of 10,568 athletes represented 204 National Olympic Committees (NOC).

The United Arab Emirates named part of its Olympic team at the Dubai Aquarium on 21 June 2012. It sent 26 athletes to complete in the London Summer Olympics: 2 in track and field, 18 football players, 3 shooters, and 1 each in judo, swimming and weightlifting. This was the largest Olympic team that the nation had sent to the Olympic Games. Along with the athletes, the United Arab Emirates sent the president of its NOC, Shaikh Ahmed bin Mohammed bin Rashid Al Maktoum, various government delegates and sport executives to the Games. Shooter Saeed Al Maktoum was chosen as the flag bearer for the parade of nations during the opening ceremony, and a LOCOG Games Maker held it for the closing ceremony.

Athletics

Betlhem Desalegn was 20 years old at the time of these Games, and was making her only appearance in Olympic competition . She qualified for the women's 1500 metres event by setting a personal best of 4 minutes, 8.87 seconds at a meet in Casablanca on 9 June 2012. Desalegn trained in Addis Ababa as preparation for the Olympics. Her coach said she could advance beyond the first round due to her light weight and fitness. On 6 August, Desalegn entered the first round of the women's 1500 metres at the Olympic Stadium, and was assigned to run in heat three. She finished the race in a time of 4 minutes, 14.07 seconds, placing 10th out of 11 finishing athletes in her heat. Since the top three in each heat plus the next fifteen fastest runners could make the semi-finals, Deslaegn was eliminated from the competition because she was 28th overall. She said she was disappointed with the result because of a cold slowing her.

At the age of 26, Mohamed Abbas Darwish was the only male athlete in the sport of athletics. He was making his debut at the Olympic Games in London. Darwish trained barefooted prior to the London Olympics. On 7 August, he took part in the qualifying round of the men's triple jump at the Olympic Stadium. Only the top 12 overall finishers were allowed to progress from the qualifying round to the final, and therefore, he was eliminated from the competition. Darwish said post-event that he did not know what happened to him because he felt nothing wrong before the competition and was unsure what had occurred to him afterwards.

Men

Women

Football

The United Arab Emirates under-23 team qualified for the men's football tournament by leading Group B in the third preliminary round of the men's Asian qualifying rounds. It was the first time that the nation had qualified for an Olympic football competition. The 18-player squad and 4 alternate players included those from the UAE Pro League and three players aged over 23. The country was drawn to play Great Britain, Senegal and Uruguay in Group A. Its first match was against Uruguay at Old Trafford, Manchester on 26 July. Ismail Matar took the lead for the UAE with a 23rd minute goal from an Omar Abdulrahman left footed pass. Uruguay took a 2–1 win with goals from Gastón Ramírez at 42 minutes and Nicolás Lodeiro at 56 minutes with involvement from Luis Suárez both times. They faced the Great Britain side three days later at Wembley Stadium, London. Ryan Giggs headed in a Craig Bellamy cross to take the lead for the home team in the 16th minute. The UAE had tied the match at 1–1 with a goal from Rashed Eisa, but Scott Sinclair restored his team's lead from another Bellamy cross at 73 minutes. The home team took a 3–1 victory when Daniel Sturridge's shot went over UAE goalkeeper Ali Khasif. At the City of Coventry Stadium on 1 August, the UAE drew 1–1 to Senegal in its final match of the tournament, finishing fourth with one point in Group A and advancing no further.

Roster

Group play

Judo

Humaid Al-Derei was 21 years old at the time of the Games. He was making his Olympic debut and was the second Emirati Olympic judoka. Al-Derei received a wild card entry to the London Summer Olympics by participating in the 2011 World Judo Championships in Paris, but this was upgraded to a direct entry through earning enough points by entering the Abu Dhabi Grand Prix over the years. He trained in Belarus, Jordan and the United Arab Emirates as preparation for the Games; he was required to wear sunglasses due to an eye disease giving him a high degree of light sensitivity. Al-Derei said his objective for the Games was to perform to the best of his ability, "I will do what I can and the rest I will leave up to God." After he received a bye for the Round of 64, he took part in the Round of 32 of the men's 66kg competition, at ExCeL London on 29 July. He faced 10th ranked judoka in the world Ahmed Awad of Egypt. Awad caused an elbow injury to Al-Derei, which restricted the latter's movement after the game commenced, and performed an ippon to win at 2 minutes, 37 seconds. Al-Derei said post-match that Awad had too tight of a grip and that his opponent was worthy of his win.

Shooting

Aged 35 at the time of the London Olympics, Saeed Al-Maktoum was making his fourth appearance at the Olympic Games. He attained qualification for the Games after winning two bronze medals at the 2012 Asian Shooting Championships in January. Al-Maktoum trained in the United Arab Emirates and went to a camp in Italy to train for the Games. Ahmad Al Kamali, the UAE Athletics Federation president, said Al-Maktoum's experience gave him an opportunity to win. On 31 July, Al-Maktoum took part in the qualification round of the skeet tournament at the Royal Artillery Barracks. He finished 13th of the 36 participants with a score of 118 points. Al-Makotum was thus eliminated at the qualification round since he scored two points less than the two lowest scoring qualifiers. He said afterwards that some errors in the qualification round and hurrying himself on occasion led to his elimination.

Juma Al-Maktoum was 27 years old at the London Games, and was debuting in Olympic competition. He qualified for the Olympic double trap tournament after winning the gold medal in the discipline at the 2012 Asian Shooting Championships. Al-Maktoum went to a camp outside Milan to train before the Games. He said he was happy to participate at the Olympics and that he had no issues in his training. On 2 August, Al-Maktoum competed in the qualification round of the men's double trap at the Royal Artillery Barracks. He finished 13th out of 23 finishers with a score of 133 points after he scored 42, 45 and 46 points in all three rounds. Al-Maktoum scored four less points than the two lowest qualifiers and was not able to advance to the final.

The oldest member of the team at the age of 39, Dhaher Al-Aryani debuted at the Olympics. He qualified for the men's trap event by using a quota place from scoring enough points delegated by the International Shooting Sport Federation at the 2012 Asian Shooting Championships. Al-Aryani partook in the men's trap qualification round at the Royal Artillery Barracks between 5 and 6 August. The team's trap shooting coach Rustam Yambulatov said on 6 August that Al-Aryani would be helped if the weather was hot. Al-Aryani placed 32nd out of the 34 entrants with a two-day score total of 107. He accumulated 15 points less than the two lowest ranked qualifiers and his competition ended at the qualification round. After the Games, Al-Aryani said, "Now after finishing this competition against some of the world's best champion shooters, I have learnt so much that I feel confident for the future."

Men

Swimming

Mubarak Al-Besher was aged 24 and competing in his first Olympic Games. FINA granted the nation a universality place, after Al-Besher's personal best of 1 minute, 4.60 seconds recorded at the 2011 Arab Games was 1.68 seconds slower than the FINA/Olympic Invitation qualifying standard for the men's 100 metre breaststroke. He trained in Málaga and swam the first leg of the Mare Nostrum meets as preparation for the Games. Al-Besher said he would perform to the best of his ability. He added, "My first goal is to break an Arab record and accomplish something no other Arab has done. So God willing, if I clock 1min 3sec or 1min 2sec, I will be very happy in London." On 28 July, he competed in the first heat of the contest at the London Aquatics Centre, finishing second out of four swimmers, with a time of 1 minute, 5.26 seconds. Al-Besher came 42nd out of 44 swimmers overall and failed to advance to the semi-finals since the quickest 16 competitors could enter the semi-finals. After he was eliminated, he commented on his result, "I was very nervous today because it was my first time at the Olympics but still I’m happy I got the chance to compete against the best in the world."

Men

Weightlifting

Khadija Mohammed participated on the United Arab Emirates's behalf in the sport of weightlifting. At age 17, she was the youngest athlete to represent the nation at the 2012 London Games, and was making her debut in the Olympics. Mohammed was chosen to be the nation's only entrant in weightlifting by the Emirates Weightlifting Federation, after it finished fifth at the 2012 Asian Weightlifting Championships. She was the first Olympic woman athlete from the UAE to earn automatic qualification, the first Gulf female Olympic weightlifter and the first head scarf or hijab wearing athlete in her Olympic sport. While she had trained prior to the Games, financial issues and postponed payment of salaries were  reasons that it became worse. Mohammed said that she wanted to venture to the Olympics with the goal to create an impression for Emirati and Gulf women and inspire girls to get into weightlifting. On 3 August, she partook in the women's heavyweight (–75 kg) weightlifting competition at ExCel London. During the event's snatch phase, Mohammed was given three attempts. She successfully lifted  of weight before she could not lift . Mohammed then successfully lifted up to  during her three tries in the clean and jerk phase. Overall, the combination of her highest scores in snatch and clean and jerk yielded a score of 113 points. Mohammed ranked ninth in the event. Afterwards she said, "I would never trade this feeling for anything else in the world. This was my time to do something for my country and I think I did the UAE proud. There is nothing more than this feeling and I want to go on and bring medals for my country."

See also
 United Arab Emirates at the 2012 Summer Paralympics

Notes

References

Nations at the 2012 Summer Olympics
2012
Olympics